Nikunau is a low coral atoll in the Gilbert Islands that forms a council district of the Republic of Kiribati.

The island is surrounded by a narrow fringing reef. Its vegetation is moderately dense and consists largely of coconut palms and pandanus.

The island's population includes 1,789 Kain Nikunau I-Kiribati people (at the most recent census). Typically, there are also a few other I-Kiribati, working for the Republic Government or the Nikunau Island Council. From time to time the United States Peace Corps and other I-Matang volunteers have been stationed there. Other residents over the years have included castaways and beachcombers in the days of whaling and itinerant trading, Protestant Samoan pastors, traders and agents running the island's trade stores and cooperatives (e.g. Andrew Turner, Tom Day, Frank Even, Kum Kee, Kwong), and Roman Catholic clergy.

Surf on Nikunau depends on location, but averages 2 ft to 8 ft in height. The tip of the island, close to the airstrip, is where two tides meet, creating the largest waves, and strong tides and currents.

History

Nikunau's history comprises oral accounts passed down through the generations, primarily from unimane to unimane (the elderly men of each family in each generation), and committed to writings by I-Matang (pale-skinned people of European descent) since the 19th century. Significant contributors among these I-Matang are Sir Arthur Grimble and H.E. Maude, who were longtime officials of the British Colony of the Gilbert and Ellice Islands; Barrie MacDonald, a professor of history who has specialised in the history of that colony and the Republic of Kiribati that was created out of it; and Jean-Paul Latouche, who wrote down the stories of unimane of the 1960s in te taetae ni Kiribati (Gilbertese language) and translated them into French. Another significant contributor is Anne Di Piazza, who carried out some archaeological digs near Rungata in the 1990s.
 
From these we know that the island has been inhabited since time immemorial (at least 2000 BP); that it was significant in Gilbertese political and cultural history in the extension of the mwaneaba system in about the 16th century; that it received its first recorded British visitors on 2 July 1765, namely Commodore John Byron and the English ships and crew under his command HMS Dolphin on their circumnavigation of the world (the island was referred to on European maps for a while as Byron Island in his honour.; and that it was the centre of I-Matang whaling operations in the 1820s to 1840s at the On-the-Line grounds (the Line referring to the Equator). Kain Nikunau resided in multi-dwelling dispersed settlements centred on probably six mwaneaba, which were the hub of social, political, religious, economic and cultural activities. They were organised along lines of blood, adoption and marriage into boti (tribal polity) and utu (extended family). Various laws, customs and beliefs applied political, economic and social roles and conduct, including birth, marriage, death and after-life/death, and regarding land, reef and ocean resources, and similar. While each mwaneaba district had much in common with neighbouring ones, and the same on neighbouring islands such as Beru, they were politically independent.

The whalers, then the oil/copra traders, then the missionaries (the London Missionary Society and the Roman Catholic mission) and then British Colonial officials caused much change to the ways of life on the island. Trade in tobacco, tools and weapons, foodstuffs and cloth developed. Tobacco and then copra became the form of currency, with cash not really being any more significant than copra until as recently as the 1980s. Existing religious beliefs were challenged by Protestant Christianity. The gerontocracy of bygone days was challenged by Protestant theocracy. Dispersed settlements were replaced with the clustered model villages that continue today, each replete with a church and a building that resembles a mwaneaba but usually has a church connection (only one of the pre-Christian mwaneaba still stands on the entire island). Identification with boti gradually waned until it seems now redundant. However, identification with utu is still strong, as is individual holdings of rights to land use. Protestant-Catholic sectarianism has been rife but is now less in evidence, although very much still present. Pre-Christian beliefs continue. Subsistence living is still the norm but cash and trade goods can still be obtained by producing copra. The other sources of cash on the island have been and still are spending by the Colony and Republic government and its officials and public employees stationed on the island, including at the "government station" or, as it is now, the Nikunau Island Council settlement (the Council receives a grant from the Government of Kiribati to cover 80+% of its recurrent spending); and remittances received by Kain Nikunau from utu working (and increasingly living permanently) overseas, elsewhere in the colony/republic and in Pacific Ocean and Rim countries and on foreign ships. These absent utu are part of a trend begun in the days of whaling, when some Kain Nikunau joined ships' crews and would be seen in various parts of the world, Atlantic as well as Pacific. Kain Nikunau featured in the Pacific labour trade throughout the rest of the 19th century, going to Samoa, Fiji, New South Wales, Queensland, Central America and so on, but typically returning to their island. In the 20th Century that working away continued notably on the phosphate islands of Banaba (Ocean Island) and Nauru, and then on Tarawa, where government and some commerce grew slowly and then more quickly from the 1950s up to the present. Tarawa was also the main or only centre for secondary education and other highly centralised "social and economic development" and still is.

While Nikunau's population has varied little from the 1,500 to 2,200 estimated or recorded at various times since the 1800s, Tarawa's population has increased from the 3,000 - 4,000 of the 1800s first half of the 20th century to around 50,000 today. There are more Kain Nikunau living on Tarawa today than on Nikunau, and many Kain Nikunau living on Tarawa have yet to set foot on Nikunau. The history of this migration is associated with the aforesaid "social and economic development", notably in education, hospitals, amenities and cash employment, started by British officials such as Michael Bernacchi and V.J. Andersen, with grants from London from the Colonial Development and Welfare Fund and carried on since Kiribati independence by the Asian Development Bank and the aid arms of various foreign governments, including Australia, Japan, Korea, New Zealand, Britain, the European Union, the UNDP, the People's Republic of China and Nationalist China. This aid is continuing to have a backwash effect on Nikunau, while giving rise to increasingly undesirable environmental and social conditions for Kain Nikunau living on Tarawa.
        
Nikunau Post Office opened around 1912, helping form the government station and now being part of the Nikunau Island Council settlement.

Transportation

Air 
Nikunau Airport is served by Air Kiribati from Beru Airport on Beru Island (from which the same airline flies to Tabiteuea North Airport, Tabiteuea, and from there, next to Beru, to Arorae (with the way back via Tamana), Nonouti, Tabiteuea South, Tamana (way there via Arorae) and Bonriki International Airport, Tarawa) on Mondays.

Bibliography
Asian Development Bank. (2009b). Kiribati’s political economy and capacity development [Online]. Available: http://www.adb.org/documents/reports/KIR-Political-Economy-Capacity-Development/KIR-Economic-Development.pdf (accessed 6 February 2012).

Bedford, R., Macdonald, B., & Munro, D. (1980). Population estimates for Kiribati and Tuvalu, 1850-1900: Review and speculation. Journal of the Polynesian Society, 89, 199-246.

Borovnik, M. (2006). Working overseas: Seafarers' remittances and their distribution in Kiribati. Asian Pacific Viewpoint, 47, 151-161.

Burnett, G. (2005). Language games and schooling: Discourses of colonialism in Kiribati education. Asia Pacific Journal of Education, 25(1), 93-106.

Cochrane, G. (1970). The Administration of Wagina Resettlement Scheme. Human Organization, 29(2), 123-132.

Correspondent. (1913, 5 June). Modern buccaneers in the West Pacific. New Age, pp. 136–140 (Online). Available: http://dl.lib.brown.edu/pdfs/1140814207532014.pdf (accessed 6 February 2012).

Couper, AD. The island trade: an analysis of the environment and operation of seaborne trade among three islands in the Pacific. Canberra: Australian National University, Department of Geography; 1967.

Couper, AD. Protest movements and proto-cooperatives in the Pacific Islands. Journal of the Polynesian Society 1968; 77: 263-74.

Davis, E. H. M., Captain RN. (1892). Proceedings of H.M.S. Royalist [Online]. Available: http://www.janeresture.com/davisdiaries/captaindavis.html and http://www.janeresture.com/nikunau/index.htm (accessed 6 February 2012).

Di Piazza, A. (1999). Te Bakoa site. Two old earth ovens from Nikunau Island (Republic of Kiribati). Archaeology in Oceania, 34(1), 40-42.

Di Piazza, A. (2001). Terre d’abondance ou terre de misère: Représentation de la sécheresse à Nikunau (République de Kiribati, Pacifique central) (Land of abundance or land of scarcity? Ideas about drought on Nikunau (Republic of Kiribati, Central Pacific)). L’Homme, 157, 35-58.

Geddes, W. H. (1977). Social individualisation on Tabiteuea Atoll. Journal of the Polynesian Society, 86, 371-393.

Geddes, W. H., Chambers, A., Sewell, B., Lawrence, R., & Watters, R. (1982), Islands on the Line, team report. Atoll economy: Social change in Kiribati and Tuvalu, No. 1, Canberra: Australian National University, Development Studies Centre.

Goodall, N. (1954). A history of the London Missionary Society 1895-1945. London: Oxford University Press.

Goodenough, W. H. (1955). A problem in Malayo-Polynesian social organization. American Anthropologist, 57, 71-83.

Grimble, A. (1921). From birth to death in the Gilbert Islands. Journal of the Royal Anthropological Institute, 51, 25-54.

Grimble, A. F. (1952). A Pattern of Islands, John Murray, London.

Grimble, A. F. (1957). Return to the Islands: Life and Legend in the Gilberts. John Murray, London

Grimble, A. F. (1989). Tungaru traditions: Writings on the atoll culture of the Gilberts, Honolulu: University of Hawaii Press.

Grimble, A. F., & Clarke, S. G. (1929). Gilbert and Ellice Islands Colony: Instructions and Hints to District Officers, Deputy Commissioners and Sub-accountants, His Britannic Majesty's High Commission for the Western Pacific, Suva, Fiji.

Ieremia T. (1993). The first twelve years, in: H. Van Trease, (Ed) Atoll Politics: The Republic of Kiribati, pp. 309–320 (Christchurch: University of Canterbury, Macmillan Brown Centre for Pacific Studies).

Kazama, K. (2001). Reorganized meeting house system: The focus of social life in a contemporary village in Tabiteuea South, Kiribati. People and Culture in Oceania, 17, 83-113.

Kiribati National Statistics Office. (2009). Keystats workbook (Online). Available: http://www.spc.int/prism/Country/KI/Stats/Economic/GFS/Revenue-Current.htm (accessed 11 September 2011).

Kiribati National Statistics Office. (2009). Statistics (Online). Available: http://www.spc.int/prism/Country/KI/Stats/index.htm (accessed 14 November 2009).

Koch, G. E. (translated by G. Slatter), (1986). The Material Culture of Kiribati, Institute of Pacific Studies of the University of the South Pacific, Suva, Fiji.

Land (Copra) Tax Register 1910-1916. Available in Kiribati National Archives, Tarawa, GEIC 4(11)/II 18.

Latouche, J-P. (1983). Mythistoire Tungaru: Cosmologies et genealogies aux Iles Gilbert. Paris: Societe d'Etudes Linguistiques et Anthropologiques de France.

Lawrence, R. (1992). Kiribati: change and context in an atoll world”, in Robillard, A. B. (Ed.), Social Change in the Pacific Islands, Kegan Paul International, London, pp. 264–99.

Lundsgaarde, H. P. (1966). Cultural Adaptation in the Southern Gilbert Islands, University of Oregon, Oregon.

Lundsgaarde, H. P. (1974). The evolution of tenure principles on Tamana Island, Gilbert Islands. In H. P. Lundsgaarde (Ed), Land tenure in Oceania (pp. 179–214). Honolulu: University Press of Hawaii.

Lundsgaarde, H. P. (1978). Post-contact changes in Gilbertese maneaba organization. In N. Gunson (Ed.) The Changing Pacific: Essays in Honour of H. E. Maude (pp. 67–79). Melbourne: Oxford University Press

Lundsgaarde, H. P., & Silverman, M. G. (1972). Category and group in Gilbertese kinship: An updating of Goodenough's analysis. Ethnology, 11, 95-110.

Macdonald, B. (1971). Local government in the Gilbert and Ellice Islands 1892-1969 - part 1. Journal of Administration Overseas, 10, 280-293.

Macdonald, B. (1972). Local government in the Gilbert and Ellice Islands 1892-1969 - part 2. Journal of Administration Overseas, 11, 11-27.

Macdonald, B. K. (1982). Cinderellas of the Empire: Towards a History of Kiribati and Tuvalu, Australian National University Press, Canberra.

Macdonald, B. (1996a). Governance and Political Process in Kiribati (Economics Division Working Papers 96/2), Canberra: Australian National University, National Centre for Development Studies.

Macdonald, B. (1996b). ‘Now an island is too big’ limits and limitations of Pacific Islands history. Journal of Pacific Studies, 20, 23–44.

Macdonald, B. (1998). Pacific Islands stakeholder participation in development: Kiribati. (Pacific Islands Discussion Paper Series No. 5). Washington, DC: World Bank, East Asia and Pacific Region, Papua New Guinea and Pacific Islands Country Management Unit.

Mason, L. (Ed.). (1985). Kiribati: A Changing Atoll Culture, University of the South Pacific, Institute of Pacific Studies, Suva, Fiji.

Maude, H. C., & Maude, H. E. (Eds.). (1994). An anthology of Gilbertese oral tradition. Suva, Fiji: Institute of Pacific Studies of the University of the South Pacific.

Maude, H. E. (1949). The Co-operative Movement in the Gilbert and Ellice Islands (Technical Paper No. 1), South Pacific Commission, Sydney.

Maude, H. E. (1952). The colonisation of the Phoenix Islands, Journal of the Polynesian Society, Vol. 61 Nos. 1-2, pp. 62–89.

Maude, H. E. (1963). The Evolution of the Gilbertese Boti: An Ethnohistorical Interpretation, Journal of the Polynesian Society, 72 (Supplement), pp. 1–68.

Maude, H. E. (1964). Beachcombers and Castaways, Journal of the Polynesian Society, 73, pp. 254–293.

Maude, H. E. (1977a). Foreword, in Sabatier, E. (translated by U. Nixon), Astride the Equator: An Account of the Gilbert Islands, Oxford University Press, Melbourne, pp. v-viii.

Maude, H. E. (1977b). Notes, in Sabatier, E. (translated by U. Nixon), Astride the Equator: An Account of the Gilbert Islands, Oxford University Press, Melbourne, pp. 353–373.

Maude, H. E. (ed.). (1991). The story of Karongoa. Suva, Fiji: Institute of Pacific Studies of the University of the South Pacific.

Maude, H. E., & Doran, E., Jr. (1966). The precedence of Tarawa Atoll. Annals of the Association of American Geographers, 56, 269-289.

Maude, H. E., & Leeson, I. (1965). The Coconut Oil Trade of the Gilbert Island, Journal of the Polynesian Society, 74, pp. 396–437.

McCreery, D., & Munro, D. (1993). The cargo of the Montserrat: Gilbertese labor in Guatemalan coffee, 1890-1908 . The Americas 49, 271-295.

Munro, D, Firth, S. Towards colonial protectorates: the case of the Gilbert and Ellice Islands. Australian Journal of Politics and History 1986; 32: 63-71.

Munro, D, Firth, S. From company rule to consular control: Gilbert Island labourers on German plantations in Samoa. Journal of Imperial and Commonwealth History 1987; 16: 24-43.

Officer on Board the Said Ship. (1767). A voyage round the world in His Majesty’s Ship the ‘Dolphin’, commanded by the honourable commodore Byron. London: J. Newbery and F. Newbery.

Sabatier, E. (translated by U. Nixon), (1977). Astride the Equator: An account of the Gilbert Islands, Oxford University Press, Melbourne.

Ward, J. M. (1946). British policy in the South Pacific (1786-1893). Sydney: Australasian Publishing.

Weeramantry, C. Nauru: environmental damage under international trusteeship. Melbourne: Oxford University Press; 1992

Williams, M., & Macdonald, B. K. (1985). The phosphateers: A history of the British Phosphate Commissioners and the Christmas Island Phosphate Commission. Melbourne University Press, Carlton, Vic.

Willmott, B. (2007). The Chinese communities in the smaller countries of the South Pacific: Kiribati, Nauru Tonga and the Cook Islands (Macmillan Brown Working Paper Series) [Online]. Available: https://web.archive.org/web/20130504194103/http://www.pacs.canterbury.ac.nz/documents/Microsoft%20Word%20-%20Willmott_WP17.pdf (accessed 6 February 2012).

References

Exhibit: The Alfred Agate Collection: The United States Exploring Expedition, 1838-1842 from the Navy Art Gallery

Gilbert Islands
Atolls of Kiribati